Amastus rufothorax is a moth of the family Erebidae. It was described by Hervé de Toulgoët in 1999. It is found in Peru.

References

Moths described in 1999
rufothorax
Moths of South America